Micromescinia pygmaea is a species of snout moth in the monotypic genus Micromescinia. The species and genus were described by Harrison Gray Dyar Jr. in 1914. It is found in Panama.

References

Moths described in 1914
Phycitinae